Huntington, known as the "Lime City", is the largest city in and the county seat of Huntington County, Indiana, United States. It is in Huntington and Union townships. It is also part of Fort Wayne, Indiana's metropolitan area. The population was 17,022 at the 2020 census.

Geography

Demographics

2010 census
As of the census of 2010, there were 17,391 people, 6,566 households, and 4,197 families living in the city. The racial makeup of the city was 96.4% White, 0.6% African American, 0.4% Native American, 0.5% Asian, 0.6% from other races, and 1.4% from two or more races. Hispanic or Latino of any race were 2.4% of the population.

There were 6,566 households, of which 34.1% had children under the age of 18 living with them, 45.2% were married couples living together, 13.3% had a female householder with no husband present, 5.4% had a male householder with no wife present, and 36.1% were non-families. Of all households 30.4% were made up of individuals, and 12.5% had someone living alone who was 65 years of age or older. The average household size was 2.48 and the average family size was 3.06.

The median age in the city was 33.4 years. 24.8% of residents were under the age of 18; 13.5% were between the ages of 18 and 24; 25.5% were from 25 to 44; 22.5% were from 45 to 64; and 13.5% were 65 years of age or older. The gender makeup of the city was 47.7% male and 52.3% female.

2000 census
As of the census of 2000, there were 17,450 people, 6,717 households, and 4,419 families living in the city. The main religion is Roman Catholic, with around 42% of the city attending masses. The racial makeup of the city was 97.83% White, 0.21% African American, 0.45% Native American, 0.45% Asian, 0.02% Pacific Islander, 0.30% from other races, and 0.73% from two or more races. Hispanic or Latino of any race were 1.12% of the population.

There were 6,717 households, out of which 33.5% had children under the age of 18 living with them, 48.9% were married couples living together, 12.4% had a female householder with no husband present, and 34.2% were non-families. Of all households 29.0% were made up of individuals, and 12.0% had someone living alone who was 65 years of age or older. The average household size was 2.46 and the average family size was 3.03.

In the city, the population was spread out, with 26.2% under the age of 18, 12.9% from 18 to 24, 28.2% from 25 to 44, 18.9% from 45 to 64, and 13.8% who were 65 years of age or older. The median age was 33 years. For every 100 females, there were 91.5 males. For every 100 females age 18 and over, there were 87.3 males.

The median income for a household in the city was $45,600, and the median income for a family was $56,454. Males had a median income of $35,830 versus $26,921 for females. The per capita income for the city was $21,242. About 5.2% of families and 7.1% of the population were below the poverty line, including 8.2% of those under age 18 and 6.4% of those age 65 or over.

Schools
The Huntington County Community School Corporation serves the city of Huntington and all of Huntington County. The corporation's lone high school, Huntington North High School, is located in Huntington. The two corporation middle schools, Crestview Middle School, Riverview Middle School, and three of the five elementary schools lie just outside the city limits. The elementary schools include Flint Springs, Horace Mann, Lincoln, Roanoke, and Salamonie. Private schools include Huntington Catholic School operated by the Roman Catholic Church.

The town has a lending library, the Huntington City-Township Public Library.

History

Name
Huntington was named by Capt. Elias Murray, a member of the legislature. The name Huntington is derived from Samuel Huntington, a judge, politician, and patriot in the American Revolution. Samuel Huntington is also known for being the 3rd Governor of Connecticut and the 7th President of the Continental Congress. Being a delegate to the Second Continental Congress, Huntington took part in voting for and signing the Declaration of Independence and the Articles of Confederation.

Early settlement
The county of Huntington was formally organized on December 2, 1834. The city of Huntington was first established by a group of pioneers, most notably Capt. Elias Murray. By 1849, Huntington contained 150 houses and a population of 700.

Historical literature

A small number of books have been published about the history of Huntington County, the first being History of Huntington County, Indiana originally published by Brant & Fuller. Two other books about Huntington include History of Huntington County, IN by Frank Sumner Bash in 1914 (describing its historical progress, its people, and its principal interests) and Huntington County, IN: Histories and Families by Turner Publishing Company in 1993 as a result of the Huntington County Historical Society officers and board of directors meeting in summer 1992 to discuss the family history of Huntington, the glue that has held together the city and county of Huntington in the heartland of the Midwest for more than 175 years.

Wabash and Erie Canal

The Wabash and Erie Canal was constructed through Huntington County in 1834 and added major economic benefit to the area. In addition to the Wabash River cutting through Huntington (see Forks of the Wabash), this newly opened trade route accelerated the population and economic growth in Huntington.

Economy
Catholic publisher Our Sunday Visitor is based in Huntington.

Communications

Local radio stations 
 WJCI FM 102.9
 WBZQ AM 1300 La Jefa Radio (Spanish)
 WVSH FM 91.9 The Edge, high school station (Huntington North High School)
 WQHU FM 105.5 FUSE FM, Huntington University

Transportation
Huntington Municipal Airport, a small airport for general aviation, lies southeast of the city.

Several highways serve the city:

Notable people

Sports 
 E. J. Tackett, professional bowler
 Gary Dilley, swimmer, Olympic silver medalist
 Dusty Fahrnow, Indy Car driver
 Josh Hart, NHRA race car driver
 Lauren Johnson, professional runner 
 Harry Mehre, player for Notre Dame Fighting Irish football (1919–21) and coach of Georgia Bulldogs football (1928–37) and Ole Miss Rebels football (1938-45).

Politics 
 U. S. Lesh, 24th Indiana Attorney General
 Lambdin P. Milligan, Civil War-era insurrectionist
 J. Danforth Quayle, former vice president of the United States, U.S. senator, U.S. representative
 J. Edward Roush, U.S. representative, father of "911 Emergency System"
 James R. Slack, state senator and Civil War general
 Andy Zay, member of the Indiana Senate

Other 
 Elizebeth (Smith) Friedman (1892–1980), author and pioneer in cryptology during WWI to WWII era, called "America's first female cryptanalyst"
 Jennifer Lancaster, author
 Mick Mars, guitarist of Mötley Crüe
 John F. Noll, Archbishop, founder of Our Sunday Visitor, a Roman Catholic newspaper and publishing company. Former pastor of St. Mary's Catholic Church
 Carrie M. Shoaff (1849–1939), artist, author, potter, playwright, correspondent
 Richard Leroy Walters, homeless philanthropist
 Dan Butler, Actor
 Joseph M. Woods, Musician, teacher.  Central Catholic High School, 1946-1972.  Director of Fort Wayne Summer Symphony, 1957-1992

Points of interest

Church of the United Brethren in Christ National Headquarters
David Alonzo and Elizabeth Purviance House
Drover Town Historic District
Forks of the Wabash
Hawley Heights Historic District
Hotel LaFontaine
Huntington County Historical Museum
Huntington Courthouse Square Historic District
Huntington University Arboretum and Botanical Garden
Huntington University
J. Edward Roush Lake
Merillat Centre for the Arts
Moore/Carlew Building
North Jefferson Street Historic District
Old Plat Historic District
Our Sunday Visitor
Quayle Vice Presidential Learning Center
Samuel Purviance House
St. Peter's First Community Church
Sheets Wildlife Museum and Learning Center
Sunken Gardens
Taylor-Zent House
The Indiana Room Genealogy Center
Victory Noll-St. Felix Friary Historic District
William Street School

References

Further reading
 Williamson, David. The 47th Indiana Volunteer Infantry: A Civil War History (Jefferson, NC: McFarland & Company, Publishers), 2012. .
 Williamson, David, ed. Slack's War: Selected Civil War Letters of General James R. Slack, 47th Indiana Volunteer Infantry, to His Wife, Ann, 1862–1865 (CreateSpace Publishing Platform), 2012. .
 Williamson, David, ed. The 47th Indiana Volunteer Infantry: Court-Martial Case Files (CreateSpace Publishing Platform), 2012. .

External links

 City of Huntington, Indiana website
 HuntingtonDaily.com, Huntington news website 
 Huntington County Tab newspaper
 Huntington Herald Press daily newspaper
 Huntington County United Economic Development
 Huntington Indiana Information
 Huntington County Community School Corporation
 Huntington City-Township Public Library

1834 establishments in Indiana
Cities in Huntington County, Indiana
Cities in Indiana
County seats in Indiana
Micropolitan areas of Indiana